Pensford Viaduct is a disused railway bridge in the village of Pensford within the historic English county of Somerset now unitary authority  Bath and North East Somerset. It is a Grade II listed building.

History

The viaduct was built in 1874 to carry the Bristol and North Somerset Railway over the valley of the River Chew. The contractor was J. Perry, of Tredegar Works, Bow.
During construction the bridge failed and had to be rebuilt.

The last scheduled passenger train to cross the viaduct was the 9:25 a.m. from Frome to Bristol on 31 October 1959; after that there were only goods trains (mainly bringing coal from Radstock), which ceased in 1964, and very occasional excursion trains. It officially closed after the Chew Stoke flood of 1968 which damaged the viaduct and other buildings in Pensford and the wider Chew Valley.

The viaduct was offered for sale for £1, in 1984; however, the likely maintenance costs were prohibitive and no one bought it. It became the property of BRB (Residuary) Ltd which took over some of the assets of the British Railways Board when it was privatised. In September 2013, BRB (Residuary) Ltd was abolished, with assets being transferred to the Highways Agency as part of the Historical Railways Estate.

In 2014 a new microbrewery in Pensford known as the Chew Valley Brewery used a depiction of the viaduct as its logo.

Architecture

Construction is of stone piers and spandrels with red brick soffits. The arches are of different widths and heights and supported by tall, tapering piers in the centre and thicker shorter ones towards the sides. Arches 5 and 13 are lower than the others dividing the bridge into sections with four higher arches at each end.

Subsequent repairs were made with concrete rather than stone, though it was dressed to look similar to the surrounding stone.

References

External links

Grade II listed buildings in Bath and North East Somerset
Railway viaducts in Somerset
Transport in Bath and North East Somerset
Grade II listed bridges
Former railway bridges in the United Kingdom